Jan Pešta (15 March 1883 – 26 January 1945) was a Czech composer. His work was part of the music event in the art competition at the 1936 Summer Olympics.

References

1883 births
1945 deaths
Czech male composers
Czech composers
Olympic competitors in art competitions
People from Sušice
20th-century Czech male musicians
Czechoslovak composers